Jesper Ilmari Korhonen Konradsson (born 4 June 1994) is a Swedish handball player for USAM Nîmes Gard and the Swedish national team.

He competed at the 2016 European Men's Handball Championship. He participated at the 2019 World Men's Handball Championship.

References

1994 births
Living people
Handball players from Gothenburg
Swedish male handball players
Expatriate handball players
Swedish expatriate sportspeople in Denmark
21st-century Swedish people